The C. H. Mitchell bridge, also known as the Mtamvuna bridge, is the second longest single span bridge in South Africa. The bridge's deck is suspended by a pair of cable hangers systems, which are supported by a cross-braced double steel arch.

The bridge is located south of Port Edward and spans the Mtamvuna River. It connects KwaZulu-Natal to the Eastern Cape and is one of the largest truss arch bridges in South Africa. It is located on the R61 Route (future N2 Wild Coast Toll Route).

History
The bridge was constructed in 1966 and is similar in design to the Fredrikstad Bridge in Norway. It replaced a ferry crossing that had been in operation since 1943. In 1963 JBH were awarded the R. 535,000 contract for the construction of the new bridge. It was constructed from corten steel, which is known for its increased resistance to atmospheric corrosion. It was formally handed over to the Public Works Department on 9 September 1966 and opened at the end of that year. The South African Institute of Civil Engineers awarded it the 'Outstanding Civil Engineering Achievement' for 1966. The bridge was named after a local pioneer, Charles Henry Mitchell, the father of Douglas Edgar Mitchell (1896–1988), MP for Natal South Coast (1948-1972).

The bridge underwent substantial refurbishment and modifications between 2000 and 2001. In the late evening on 27 November 2002 the bridge was significantly damaged by two explosive devices which were detonated on the Eastern Cape side of the bridge. The bombings were later attributed to the Boeremag, a right-wing terrorist organisation, with white separatist aims. The explosions damaged the steel arch structure as well as its two supports, and the bridge was closed to traffic for three weeks whilst being repaired. The bridge repair received a South African Institute of Civil Engineers award in the technical category in 2006.

See also 
List of arch bridges by length
List of bridges in South Africa

References

External links 

Bridges in South Africa
N2 road (South Africa)
Buildings and structures in KwaZulu-Natal
Bridges completed in 1966
Steel bridges
Deck arch bridges